Dow Gardens is a  botanical garden located at 1809 Eastman Avenue, Midland, Michigan, United States. Visitors are invited to leave the pathway and explore the uniquely-designed landscape, take a tour of the historic Pines Home, participate in one of many hands-on educational programs, stroll the nation’s longest canopy walk, and discover beautiful art and music in a relaxed setting.

Dow Gardens began as a home for entrepreneur Herbert Dow, his wife Grace A. Dow, and their seven children. The 1899 Pines of Dow Gardens is located at the southwest corner of the campus. As a National Historic Landmark, The Pines welcomes visitors for guided tours and special events. The home, which is still filled with the Dow family’s furnishings, provides an intimate look into their life. Upon Herbert's passing, Grace A. Dow established Herbert H. and Grace A. Dow Foundation, has charter goals to improve the educational, religious, economic, and cultural lives of the people of the City of Midland and the State of Michigan. Dow Gardens is a significant gift of The Foundation as the family shares the estate with the community and its visitors.

Attractions
In addition to the visitor center and gift shop, are the award-winning Children's Garden, Estate Garden, Exploration Garden, Founder's Circle, Orchard, Canopy Walk, Playground, and The Pines of Dow Gardens (a national historic landmark). During the spring/summer months, the Garden is home to over 35,000 annuals. Each year the Dow Gardens uses a variety of annual bedding plants as part of the summer botanical display. 

Tour the longest canopy walk in the U.S. at Whiting Forest in Midland

Recent Accolades
 2017-AAS Landscape Design Challenge Winner
 2018-TripAdvisor Certificate of Excellence
 2018-Keep Michigan Beautiful President's Award
 2019-Midland Business Alliance Heritage Award
 2019-Bette R. Tollar Civic Commitment Award
 2019-AIA Tri-State Architectural Excellence in Design Bronze Award
 2019-Society of American Registered Architects (SARA) Award of Merit

See also 
 List of botanical gardens in the United States

External links
Dow Gardens

Botanical gardens in Michigan
Midland, Michigan
Protected areas of Midland County, Michigan
1899 establishments in Michigan